Bottesford may refer to:
Bottesford, Leicestershire, England
Bottesford, Lincolnshire, England

See also
Bottlesford, Wiltshire, England